

See also
 List of dialling codes in Pakistan
 List of mobile codes in Pakistan
 Telephone numbers in Pakistan

References

Mobile network operators
Telecommunications companies of Pakistan
Lists of companies of Pakistan